Schistura novemradiata is a species of ray-finned fish, a stone loach, in the genus Schistura which has been recorded from a single locality in the upper Nam Tha watershed in Laos where it was found in a small stream over a substrate consisting of gravel and stone.

References

N
Fish described in 2000